Live coding is the use of interactive programming in the arts.

Livecode may also refer to:

 LiveCode, a commercial cross-platform rapid application development language inspired by HyperTalk
 LiveCode (company), a computer software company